Al Caldwell is an R&B musician who mainly plays the bass guitar and banjo with the Travelling Black Hillbillies. He is also a studio engineer and producer.

Career
Born in St. Louis, Missouri, Caldwell started out as a clarinet player and moved on to the trumpet. He attended Mississippi Valley State on scholarship.  He has played for a variety of entertainers including Vanessa Williams, He also works for hire on studio albums as a session musician. He has performed on a number of television shows.

When Caldwell plays electric bass, he usually performs using Extended-range basses, (or "ERBs"), which are electric bass guitars with more range (usually meaning more strings, but sometimes additional frets are added for more range) than the "standard" 4-string bass guitar.  The techniques used to play the extended-range bass are closely related to those used for basses, including finger plucking, slapping, popping, and tapping, though a plectrum (pick) is very rarely used. The upper strings of an extended-range bass allow bassists to adopt playing styles of the electric guitar. One such style is the practice of "comping", or playing a rhythmic chordal accompaniment to an improvised solo. Al Caldwell was the first MIDI 9 string bassist. Conklin Basses made the first Midi 9 string for Al Caldwell. Al Caldwell had Benavente Basses make the first 11 string MIDI bass.

Discography 
2004 9 String Human Being - Baby Al Music
2004 Good Livin - Baby Al Music
2004 Hillbilly Soul - Baby Al Music
2004 Hootananny Soul - Baby Al Music
2005 Hell if I know  - Baby Al Music
2005 Forbidden       - Baby Al Music
2005 Bass for Lovers - Baby Al Music

References

External links 
 
 9 String Bass
 Al Caldwell and the Travelling Hillbillies

American session musicians
American banjoists
American bass guitarists
Living people
Musicians from St. Louis
Guitarists from Missouri
American male bass guitarists
Year of birth missing (living people)